The Los Trigos Land Grant was established in the very early 19th century. The grant is situated on the Pecos River in San Miguel County, New Mexico, about 29 miles south west of Santa Fe and 38 miles west of Las Vegas via I-25.

Geography
The "communities" within the grant were Los Trigos itself, Pajarito and Las Ruedas. Of the three, only Pajarito remains with a few buildings visible from I-25 a couple of miles south of Rowe, New Mexico. The grant never had any other communities and itself was sandwiched between the Pecos Pueblo Indian Grant on the north and The San Miguel del Bado Land Grant on the South.

Owners
Over recent times, the grant has been owned by a succession of people, mostly associated with the film industry. They have included Greer Garson and her husband Buddy Fogelson, Jane Fonda and Val Kilmer. Currently there is no private access to the grant except for the northern portion currently owned and managed by the Pecos National Historical Park.

At one time, the grant was owned by the Atchison, Topeka and Santa Fe Railway and extensively logged for railroad ties. The Ponderosa Pine, which was an important component on the grant, was essentially removed as a result of the tie making going on as the railroad passed near by.

The name of New Mexico's first Hispanic Governor, Donaciano Vigil, after the Americans conquered and annexed the province, is closely associated with the grant.

References

External links
Los Trigos Land Grant on dev.newmexicohistory.org

Geography of San Miguel County, New Mexico
Land grants